The University of Florida College of Dentistry is the dental school of the University of Florida. The college is located in the Dental Sciences Building on the southeastern edge of the university's Gainesville, Florida main campus.  The college is one of the six academic colleges and schools that make up the university's J. Hillis Miller Health Science Center. The college is the only publicly funded dental school in the state of Florida. As of 2019 there were 365 DMD students enrolled in the college, and 133 faculty members and 148 residents/interns/fellows were employed by the college.

Research
For fiscal year 2019, the college received over $13 million in total research grants.

Rankings
In the 2017 QS World University Rankings the college ranked 47th overall amongst all dentistry colleges across the globe.

See also 

 University of Florida College of Medicine
 University of Florida College of Nursing
 University of Florida College of Pharmacy
 University of Florida College of Public Health and Health Professions
 University of Florida College of Veterinary Medicine

References

External links 
 UF College of Dentistry
 Gainesville Sun info about the College
 Message from the Dean
 Jacksonville Branch campus info
 Capital Campaign for the College
 Gainesville Sun article about the College
 Info about the Health Science Center

Educational institutions established in 1972
Dentistry
Dental schools in Florida
1972 establishments in Florida